The HSL-class fleet support vessels are a series of five fleet tanker planned to be built by Hindustan Shipyard (HSL), Visakhapatnam with technology transfer from Turkey's Anadolu Shipyard for the Indian Navy. The deal is expected to be signed in FY2021–22. The primary role of the vessels would be to replenish ships of the Indian Navy with fuel, food and various other supplies.

History 
The fleet support ship project was given a go ahead to augment the existing fleet in 2014. Initially, HSL planned to have a design consultancy with Hyundai Heavy Industries. However, the deal fell off due to latter's insistence of manufacturing the first ship in Korea and disagreement in procurement of major components.

TAIS, Turkey emerged as lowest bidder for the project after the negotiations fell between HSL and Hyundai Heavy Industries. TAIS defeated other shipbuilding behemoths from Germany, Russia, Spain. However, the deal got stuck due to Turkey's stance on Jammu and Kashmir. Later, Hindustan Shipyard and Indian Navy signed the contract with TAIS, Turkey. The design consultancy will be provided by Anadolu Shipyard with transfer of technology required for the manufacturing of the ship.

Construction

The final deal is expected to be signed in October 2021 and the first ship will be delivered 4 years after the contract signing. Subsequent ships will be delivered after an interval of 10-12 months.

Design 
The ships will be equipped with state of the art refueling facility and a hangar which can accommodate one HAL Dhruv.

These ship will be able to achieve pumping rates up to 2400 TPH. The vessel will also be able to carry ammunition and victualing stores for the fleet. The ship would be equipped with weapons like anti-ship, anti-submarine and CIWS systems.

Ships of the class

See also 
 Future of the Indian Navy

References 

Auxiliary replenishment ship classes
Auxiliary ships of the Indian Navy
Proposed ships